Merouana District is a district of Batna Province, Algeria.

Municipalities
The district further divides into four municipalities.
Merouana
Hidoussa
Ksar Bellezma
Oued El Ma

Districts of Batna Province